Shades of Blue is a remix album by American hip hop musician Madlib over the archives of Blue Note Records. It was officially released by Blue Note Records on June 24, 2003.

Critical reception

Sam Samuelson of AllMusic said: "Intent listening doesn't really give much up, but for smooth subconscious grooves, it's perfect."

In 2014, Paste placed it at number 11 on the "12 Classic Hip-Hop Albums That Deserve More Attention" list.

Track listing

Charts

References

External links
 
 WhoSampled
 Stone Throw Records

2003 remix albums
Madlib albums
Blue Note Records albums
Jazz rap albums